Cerebra is a UK charity dedicated to helping the parents of children with brain related neurological conditions. Their strapline is "Working Wonders for Children With Brain Conditions".

Cerebra help children with any kind of brain related condition, whether it be one they were born with such as Cerebral Palsy or Autism, or a condition acquired through an injury.

they help through mostly research and funding research at a number of academic chairs across mainly the UK. https://www.birmingham.ac.uk/schools/psychology/centres/cerebra/index.aspx

Awards ceremonies
Cerebra held a "Children's Awards" ceremony in autumn 2008 (10 Downing Street), autumn 2009 (the Millennium Stadium, Cardiff) and autumn 2010 (the Zoological Society, London Zoo).  The awards recognise particularly special achievements by children with disabilities or their parents or carers.

External links 
 Cerebra's Official Site

Charities based in Wales